Vjerica Radeta (born 15 October 1955) is a Serbian politician. She is a prominent figure in the far-right Serbian Radical Party (Srpska radikalna stranka, SRS) and has served several terms in the National Assembly of Serbia.

Early life and career
Radeta was born in Livno, in what was then the People's Republic of Bosnia and Herzegovina in the Federal People's Republic of Yugoslavia. A graduate of the University of Sarajevo's law faculty, she later moved to Serbia and now resides in the Belgrade municipality of Zemun. She was secretary of the Zemun municipal assembly in the late 1990s, at a time when the Radicals governed the municipality.

Politician

The late Milošević years (1998–2000)
After several years in opposition, the Radical Party joined a coalition government led by the Socialist Party of Serbia (Socijalistička partija Srbije, SPS) in February 1998, and Radeta was afterward appointed as a deputy minister of justice in the government of Serbian prime minister Mirko Marjanović. In February 2000, in the aftermath of the Kosovo War, she was included on a list of Serbian government officials banned from travelling to European Union countries.

Radeta was given the fifth and final position on the Radical Party's electoral list for New Belgrade in the 2000 Yugoslavian parliamentary election. The Radicals won a single seat in the division, which was automatically assigned to their first-ranked candidate, party leader Vojislav Šešelj. Radeta also ran for the City Assembly of Belgrade in the concurrent 2000 Serbian local elections and lost to a candidate of the Democratic Opposition of Serbia (Demokratska opozicija Srbije, DOS) in Zemun's eleventh division.

Both the parliamentary and the local elections were overshadowed by the 2000 Yugoslavian presidential election, in which SPS leader and incumbent president Slobodan Milošević was defeated by DOS candidate Vojislav Koštunica. This was a watershed event in the political culture of Yugoslavia and Serbia; the Marjanović government fell shortly after Milošević's defeat, and Radeta's tenure as a deputy minister came to an end.

Parliamentarian (2003–2012)

Živković and Koštunica administrations (2003–08)
Radeta received the forty-second position on the Radical Party's electoral list in the 2000 Serbian parliamentary election, which was held after Milošević's fall from power. The SRS won twenty-three seats, and Radeta was not initially included in its assembly delegation. (From 2000 to 2011, Serbian parliamentary mandates were awarded to sponsoring parties or coalitions rather than to individual candidates, and it was common practice for the mandates to be assigned out of numerical order. Radeta could have been included in the SRS delegation at the start of parliament notwithstanding her position on the list, but she was not.) The DOS won a landslide victory, and the Radical Party served in opposition. Radeta ultimately received a mandate on 25 March 2003 as the replacement for another SRS member who had resigned.

She was given the thirty-fifth position on the Radical Party's list in the 2003 Serbian parliamentary election and was awarded a mandate for a second term when the list won eighty-two seats. Although the Radicals won more seats than any other party in this election, they fell well short of a majority and continued to serve in opposition. During this term, Radeta served as deputy chair of the judiciary and administration committee and was a member of the committee on constitutional affairs. In 2005, she attempted to amend Serbia's information law to ban the registration of media outlets that, in her words, "report[ed] notorious lies by pathological liar Nataša Kandić," a Serbian human rights activist and vocal opponent of Serbian nationalism.

Radeta appeared in the fifth position on the SRS list for the Zemun municipal assembly in the 2004 Serbian local elections and was elected when the list won a plurality victory with twenty-six out of fifty-seven mandates. She did not seek re-election at the local level in 2008.

She was again included on the Radical Party's list in the 2007 parliamentary election and was given a mandate for a third term when the party won eighty-one seats. As before, the Radicals won the greatest number of seats but could not form government and remained in opposition. Radeta again served on the justice and constitutional affairs committees and was deputy chair of the legislative committee; she was also a member of Serbia's republic election commission during this time.

Cvetković administration (2008–12)
Radeta appeared in the eighth position on the SRS list in the 2008 parliamentary election and was again included in her party's delegation when the list won seventy-eight seats. The results of this election were inconclusive, and the Radicals afterward held discussions with the  Democratic Party of Serbia (Demokratska stranka Srbije, DSS) and the Socialists about forming a coalition government. This ultimately did not happen; the Socialists instead joined a coalition government led by the For a European Serbia (Za evropsku Srbiju, ZES) alliance, and the Radicals continued in opposition. In this term, Radeta again served on the legislative, constitutional affairs, and justice committees and was a member of the committee on interethnic relations and the parliamentary friendship group with Japan.

In July 2008, Radeta took part in a Belgrade rally against the Serbian government's decision to extradite former Bosnian Serb leader Radovan Karadžić to the International Criminal Tribunal for the former Yugoslavia (ICTY) in The Hague for crimes committed during the Bosnian War. During a Radical Party press conference, she said that Serbian president Boris Tadić could meet the same fate as Zoran Đinđić, the former Serbian prime minister who was assassinated in 2003 after approving the extradition of Slobodan Milošević. Radeta was quoted as saying, "We are not threatening (him), but we are warning of the curse which followed all the traitors in Serbian history." She also said that the Radicals had asked the Serbian Orthodox Church to state its opinion on the extradition, on the grounds that only the church could formally excommunicate members and cast anathemas on them; the party's hope was that the church would take these steps against Tadić. Radeta's comments were widely reported in the international media, including the New York Times. Nada Kolundžija, a prominent member of Tadić's Democratic Party (Demokratska stranka, DS), stated that "Radeta's comments could be interpreted as a call for violence, as justification for [Đinđić]'s murder." Some of Tadić's supporters called for legal action to be taken against Radeta.

The Radical Party experienced a serious split later in 2008, with several prominent members joining the more moderate Serbian Progressive Party (Srpska napredna stranka, SNS) under the leadership of Tomislav Nikolić and Aleksandar Vučić. Radeta remained with the Radicals and was considered a leading figure in the party's hardline wing. During an assembly debate in September 2008, after Karadžić's extradition, Radeta shouted, "A curse on every Radical, on his seed and family, who ever meets with Tadić after the shameful extradition." The Economist noted that this comment was directed at Nikolić, who had met with Tadić to ensure the passage of a key agreement with the European Union.

Serbia's electoral system was reformed in 2011, such that parliamentary mandates were awarded in numerical order to candidates on successful lists. Radeta received the sixth position on the Radical Party's list in the 2012 parliamentary election and was given the same position in the 2014 election. The party fell below the electoral threshold both times.

Return to parliament and after (2016–present)
The Radicals won twenty-two seats in the 2016 parliamentary election. Radeta, who again received the sixth position on the party's list, was elected to a fifth term. The Radicals once again served in opposition, and Radeta became the deputy leader of her party's assembly group. At the beginning of this parliament, she was selected as one of its six deputy speakers. She was also a member of the committee on constitutional and legal issues; a member of the committee on the judiciary, public administration, and local self-government; a member of the committee on the rights of the child; a deputy member of the committee on administrative, budgetary, mandate, and immunity issues; and a member of the parliamentary friendship groups with Belarus, Russia, and Venezuela.

Radeta insulted Democratic Alliance of Croats in Vojvodina leader Tomislav Žigmanov in May 2018, calling him an Ustasha.

On 24 July 2018, Radeta responded to the death of Hatidža Mehmedović, founder of the Mothers of Srebrenica organization, by tweeting, "Who is going to bury her? The husband or sons?" Mehmedović's husband and two sons were killed by Serb forces in the 1995 Srebrenica massacre, and Radeta's comment was immediately condemned by several politicians and human rights groups in Serbia. Zorana Mihajlović, one of Serbia's deputy prime ministers, said, "we are used to listening to the ugliest words from the [Radical Party] officials, but I could not believe that they are so shameless to offend the dead [...] this is not the shame for the Radicals, it is a disgrace for those who voted for them and brought them to the parliament." Representatives of the Sandžak Council for Protection of Human Rights and Freedom urged Serbian civil society and media to distance themselves from "this sublimate of fascism" and "clearly reject it and support justice for both dead and alive.”

Radeta deleted her Twitter account in the aftermath of this controversy. Šešelj contended that Radeta's tweet had been "clumsily" expressed and its meaning misunderstood: Radeta, he said, had meant to imply that Mehmedović's husband and sons had faked their deaths and were still alive in exile under assumed names. An article in the newspaper Politika from this period noted that Radeta was known for using extremely abusive language on Twitter long before this specific controversy and observed that, "it would be hard for a respectable newspaper to reprint even a fraction of the epithets that the Deputy Speaker of the Assembly of Serbia used in reference to her various opponents."

She was given the fifth position on the SRS list in the 2020 parliamentary election and was promoted to the fourth position in the 2022 parliamentary election. In both cases, the list failed to cross the electoral threshold.

Parliamentary Assembly of the Council of Europe
Radeta was appointed as a substitute member of Serbia's delegation to the Parliamentary Assembly of the Council of Europe (PACE) on 25 June 2007 and continued in this role until 1 November 2012. For most of her tenure, she was a member of the social, health, and family affairs committee. She did not serve with any political grouping.

Warrant for arrest
In January 2015, Radeta and two other members of the Radical Party (Petar Jojić and Jovo Ostojić) were charged with contempt of court by the ICTY for having allegedly "threatened, intimidated, offered bribes to or otherwise interfered with" witnesses in the trial of party leader Vojislav Šešelj. According to Agence France Presse, Radeta was specifically accused of having "contacted a prosecution witness and [telling] him Šešelj's lawyers 'would help him' if he changed his testimony" in a contempt of court case against the Radical Party leader. The witness was described as having later received a monthly payment from the Radical Party and a list of questions and answers to memorize.

The three accused SRS members declined to go to The Hague to face the charges, and the Belgrade Higher Court subsequently ruled that the country was not obligated to extradite them. The ruling indicated that Serbian law only requires the extradition of persons accused of serious offences such as war crimes, not those accused of contempt of court or other comparatively minor crimes. The tribunal continued to demand that the three Radicals be extradited, arguing that Serbia's existing legal framework could not be used as an excuse for non-compliance and urging the country to change its legislation to comply with the arrest warrants. Foreign affairs minister Ivica Dačić responded in August 2016 that Serbia's law on extraditions had been adopted by the Serbian parliament in cooperation with international agencies, that no objections were raised at the time, and that the tribunal had no authority to propose changes.

In March 2017, Interpol issued high-priority red notices for the arrests of Radeta and her two colleagues. Rasim Ljajić, a deputy prime minister of Serbia, responded by stating that, "There is a Serbian court ruling that they will not be surrendered. There is no legal ground for this [extradition], and we have to respect the conclusions of the independent judicial authorities."

With the wrapping up of the ICTY in December 2017, the case was transferred to the International Residual Mechanism for Criminal Tribunals (IRMCT). The matter remains unresolved as of 2022. Both Radeta and Jojić continued to serve in the national assembly until 3 August 2020. Ostojić died of natural causes in June 2017 without having been arrested or extradited.

In December 2020, the IRMCT reiterated its demand that Radeta and Jojić be extradited to The Hague. In June of the following year, Serbian president Aleksandar Vučić reaffirmed his government's view that the decision of the Belgrade Higher Court was binding and that the two accused would not be extradited.

Electoral record

Local (Belgrade)

References

1955 births
Living people
People from Livno
Serbs of Bosnia and Herzegovina
Politicians from Belgrade
Members of the National Assembly (Serbia)
Substitute Members of the Parliamentary Assembly of the Council of Europe
Serbian Radical Party politicians